The women's high jump event  at the 1978 European Athletics Indoor Championships was held on 11 March in Milan.

Results

References

High jump at the European Athletics Indoor Championships
High
Euro